The Fleet coinage was a set of bronze coins minted by Mark Antony in the eastern Mediterranean from 40 BC until 30 BC. The coinage introduced Roman-style denominations to the eastern half of the Roman empire and formed the basis for the monetary reforms under Augustus. The coinage is also referred to by numismatists as RPC 1 1453-70 and 4092, after their designation in M. H. Crawford, Roman Republican Coinage (1975).

Description
In 40 BC, the rivals Mark Antony and Octavian agreed to the Treaty of Brundisium, which assigned the eastern half of the Roman empire to Mark Antony. The fleet coinage was a set of bronze denominations issued to serve as small change for the region under his control. Modern scholars refer to it as the "fleet coinage" because they were minted by three of Antony's fleet prefects, Lucius Calpurnius Bibulus, Lucius Sempronius Atratinus and Marcus Oppius Capito, who are named on the obverse of the issues. There are six denominations, as follows:

Based on where the coins have been found, it appears that there were three separate mints: one at the Roman colony of Corinth, which had been founded in 44 BC; one at a coastal city in the Levant; and probably one in Piraeus, the port of Athens.

References

Bibliography
 
 
 
 
 
 

Coins of ancient Rome
Roman Corinth
Roman Athens
Mark Antony
1st century BC in the Roman Republic